

1950 

 July - A Zambesi shark, Carcharhinus leucas, was caught at the confluence of the Limpopo and Luvuvhu Rivers.
 November 19 - Ranger Nyokane Shilobane shot dead by poachers near Malelane.

1953 
 November – The construction of Orpen rest camp starts. After completion in 1954, it replaced the old Rabelais rest camp and entrance gate.

1957 
 December 10 - Major James Stevenson-Hamilton, warden of the Sabi Game Reserve and the Kruger National Park (1902 - 1946), dies at the age of 90 in White River.

1958 
 September 22 - Ranger Johannes Maluleke murdered with an axe near Punda Maria. The three poachers responsible were arrested and convicted of murder.

1959 
 April - Mahlangeni ranger post, situated at the confluence of the Groot Letaba and Klein Letaba Rivers, opens.
 September 28 – An outbreak of anthrax rapidly spreads throughout the area north of the Letaba River. 101 carcasses, mainly kudu, are found and burnt before the epidemic ends in November 1959.

See also 
History of the Kruger National Park
The Kruger National Park in the 1960s
The Kruger National Park in the 1970s
The Kruger National Park in the 1980s

References 

Kruger National Park